Andrew Graham Priaulx, MBE (  born 8 August 1974) is a British professional racing driver from Guernsey. In 2019 he raced for Ford Chip Ganassi Team UK in the FIA World Endurance Championship, and Cyan Racing Lynk & Co in the FIA World Touring Car Cup, having been a former BMW factory driver.

He is a European Touring Car Championship champion, three times World Touring Car Championship champion and the only FIA Touring Car champion to win an international-level championship for four consecutive years (2004 to 2007). The previous record was Roberto Ravaglia's three successive championships (1986–1988).

Racing career
Born in Guernsey, Priaulx has competed in many types of motorsport, beginning in karting at the minimum age of eight. After a brief flirtation with powerboat racing, he started hillclimbing while still a teenager, sharing a car with his father Graham. It was quickly apparent that he had great natural ability, and few people were surprised when he took the British Hillclimb Championship title in 1995.

After this, he made the switch to circuit racing, where after a relatively low-key couple of years in Formula Renault UK Championship and British Formula 3 he eventually demonstrated his skills were transferable by switching to the Renault Spider championship in 1998, completely dominating it in 1999. His career stalled somewhat when he returned to British Formula 3 in 2000–01. He had some success at this level, but despite finishing sixth in the championship in 2001 was unable to progress further up the single-seater ladder.

Touring cars

In 2001 Priaulx had a pair of British Touring Car Championship (BTCC) guest drives for the Egg Vauxhall team, standing in for the suspended Phil Bennett. He stunned the regulars by taking pole position on his debut at Oulton Park, demonstrating that his future appeared to lie in that direction.

The following year he was signed by the works Honda BTCC team for their 2002 campaign. He won one race and finished on the podium in two others, and the following season was signed by Bart Mampaey's BMW UK team for their European Touring Car Championship (ETCC) effort. He was in contention for the title until late in the year, eventually finishing third. Priaulx also occasionally guested in Australian V8 Supercar racing, competing at the Bathurst 1000km in 2002 with Yvan Muller in a Kmart Racing Commodore and 2003 with Cameron McLean again in a Kmart Commodore, and also the Sandown 500 km in 2003.

2004 saw Priaulx win a major circuit racing championship, as he became ETCC champion after a season-long battle with Dirk Müller. Both men obtained the same number of points, but Priaulx had won five races as against Müller's three, and this was sufficient to hand the Priaulx the title.

Priaulx repeated his 2004 success in 2005, 2006 and 2007, clinching the World Touring Car Championship (WTCC, essentially the same series, with two races outside Europe in 2005 and three in 2006) at the final round in Macau. In 2005, he won the crown with two second-place finishes in the final round when his nearest rivals, Dirk Müller and Fabrizio Giovanardi both failed to score. The following year, a win in the opening race of the final meeting left him needing to finish fifth in the final event to beat Jörg Müller by a single point, which he achieved.

Heading into the final meeting of the 2007 WTCC season at Macau, Priaulx was joint leader of the championship alongside former BTCC champion Yvan Muller. He came eighth in the first race and won from pole position in the second race to claim his and BMW's third WTCC championship in a row.

He was appointed Member of the Order of the British Empire (MBE) in the 2008 Birthday Honours.Priaulx again raced in the World Touring Car Championship for BMW Team UK in 2009, finishing fourth in the standings. As well as the WTCC, he competed in selected rounds of the American Le Mans Series for BMW and a number of races in the Australian V8 Supercars championship, driving a Walkinshaw Racing Holden with David Reynolds at the Phillip Island and Bathurst endurance races.

In 2010, Priaulx continued to race in the World Touring Car Championship for BMW and competed in several races for BMW in the Le Mans Series, 2010 Armor All Gold Coast 600 in V8 Supercars with Craig Lowndes, Race of Champions, as well as the Le Mans 24 Hours.On 5 December 2010, BMW announced that it would not be continuing its factory effort in the World Touring Car Championship from 2011 onwards. It was announced on 25 January 2011, that Priaulx contest the Intercontinental Le Mans Cup for BMW, as well as undertaking testing duties for BMW with cars from other racing categories.
Priaulx spent the 2012 and 2013 seasons racing for BMW in the Deutsche Tourenwagen Masters, scoring his best result in the final round of the 2013 season at the Hockenheimring, where he finished in sixth after starting in third. He switched to racing in the United SportsCar Championship in the United States for 2014. In January 2015 it was announced at Autosport International that Priaulx would return to the British Touring Car Championship for 2015 with West Surrey Racing, campaigning a BMW 125i M Sport, combining his BTCC programme with racing works BMWs in the European Le Mans Series and the North American Endurance Cup.

On 10 December 2018, it was announced that Priaulx will join Lynk & Co Cyan Racing for the 2019 World Touring Car Cup season, partnering former WTCC champions Yvan Muller, Thed Björk and Yvan's nephew Yann Ehrlacher. On 17 November 2019, Priaulx secured his maiden win in the FIA World Touring Car Cup in Macau.

Ford WEC

On 5 December 2015, it was announced that Priaulx had parted ways with BMW after a 13-year stint with the German manufacturer to join Ford Chip Ganassi Team UK for their upcoming debut in the 2016 FIA World Endurance Championship season. He was officially unveiled as a Ford driver on 5 January 2016 alongside teammates Marino Franchitti, Stefan Mücke, and Olivier Pla.

Personal life
Priaulx's son Sebastian Priaulx is also a racing driver. He competed in the 2019 British GT Championship and was in contention for the GT4 title, driving with Scott Maxwell, but lost out on the title to Tom Canning and Ash Hand by 8.5 points.

Nationality
Although Priaulx is British, he has occasionally been mistakenly identified as French due to his surname, which is common in Francophone countries; a French national flag was displayed above the podium at the first race in Curitiba in the 2007 WTCC season.

Racing record

Career summary

† As Priaulx was a guest driver, he was ineligible to score points.

Complete British Touring Car Championship results
(key) (Races in bold indicate pole position – 1 point awarded all races) (Races in italics indicate fastest lap – 1 point awarded all races) (* signifies that driver lead feature race for at least one lap – 1 point awarded)

Complete V8 Supercar Championship results

+ Not Eligible for points

Complete European Touring Car Championship results
(key) (Races in bold indicate pole position) (Races in italics indicate fastest lap)

Complete World Touring Car Championship results
(key) (Races in bold indicate pole position) (Races in italics indicate fastest lap)

† — Did not finish the race, but was classified as he completed over 90% of the race distance.

Intercontinental Le Mans Cup results
(key) (Races in bold indicate pole position) (Races in italics indicate fastest lap)

Complete Deutsche Tourenwagen Masters results
(key) (Races in bold indicate pole position) (Races in italics indicate fastest lap)

† Driver did not finish, but completed 90% of the race distance

Complete WeatherTech SportsCar Championship results
(key) (Races in bold indicate pole position) (Races in italics indicate fastest lap)

Complete European Le Mans Series results

Complete FIA World Endurance Championship results
(key) (Races in bold indicate pole position; races in italics indicate fastest lap)

Complete World Touring Car Cup results
(key) (Races in bold indicate pole position) (Races in italics indicate fastest lap)

† Driver did not finish, but completed 90% of the race distance.

Complete British GT Championship results
(key) (Races in bold indicate pole position) (Races in italics indicate fastest lap)

Complete Bathurst 1000 results

Complete 24 Hours of Le Mans results

References

External links

 
 
 Andy Priaulx Performance Management

1974 births
Living people
People educated at Elizabeth College, Guernsey
Members of the Order of the British Empire
British racing drivers
Racing drivers from Guernsey
British Formula Three Championship drivers
British hillclimb drivers
Formula Palmer Audi drivers
French Formula Three Championship drivers
British Touring Car Championship drivers
Supercars Championship drivers
World Touring Car Championship drivers
World Touring Car Champions
World Touring Car Cup drivers
American Le Mans Series drivers
European Le Mans Series drivers
24 Hours of Le Mans drivers
Deutsche Tourenwagen Masters drivers
Rolex Sports Car Series drivers
24 Hours of Daytona drivers
WeatherTech SportsCar Championship drivers
24 Hours of Spa drivers
European Touring Car Championship drivers
FIA World Endurance Championship drivers
Renault UK Clio Cup drivers
BMW M drivers
TOM'S drivers
Racing Bart Mampaey drivers
Alan Docking Racing drivers
Schnitzer Motorsport drivers
Rahal Letterman Lanigan Racing drivers
Chip Ganassi Racing drivers
Multimatic Motorsports drivers
Arena Motorsport drivers
OAK Racing drivers
Manor Motorsport drivers